Alan Wyatt (born 4 April 1935) is an Australian cricketer. He played twenty first-class matches for New South Wales between 1956/57 and 1958/59.

See also
 List of New South Wales representative cricketers

References

External links
 

1935 births
Living people
Australian cricketers
New South Wales cricketers
Cricketers from Sydney